The 2007 Cleveland Browns season was the franchise's 59th season as a professional sports franchise and its 55th season as a member of the National Football League. The season began with the Browns attempting to improve upon their 4–12 record from the 2006 season, in which the team finished in fourth place in the AFC North. The Browns also attempted to overcome the many injuries that plagued the team throughout the 2006 season. The Browns remained under the supervision of head coach Romeo Crennel and they played all of their home games in Cleveland Browns Stadium in Cleveland, Ohio.

During the 2007 NFL Draft, the Browns selected Wisconsin offensive tackle Joe Thomas with the third overall selection. The Browns were also able to draft Notre Dame quarterback Brady Quinn with the 22nd overall selection, after completing a trade with the Dallas Cowboys, which saw the Browns send their second-round pick in the 2007 draft, along with their first-round pick in the 2008 NFL Draft, to the Cowboys for their first-round selection at number 22. The Browns completed their first-day draft by selecting UNLV cornerback Eric Wright, following another trade with Dallas, which saw the Browns giving up their third- and fourth-round picks in the 2007 draft and swapping sixth-round picks with the Cowboys.

During the off-season, the Browns signed key free agents Eric Steinbach (Cincinnati, offensive guard), Jamal Lewis (Baltimore, running back), and Robaire Smith (Tennessee, defensive end).

The Browns ultimately finished the season with a 10–6 record but nevertheless failed to qualify for the playoffs. They were beaten for the division title on a tiebreaker by the Pittsburgh Steelers and lost another tiebreaker for a wildcard berth to the Tennessee Titans. The team finished the season having scored 402 points with 5,621 yards of total offense, both 8th best in the NFL; however, the defense allowed 382 points (21st best) and gave up 5,753 yards (30th best).

As of January 3, 2021, this remains the second-best record and the second of three winning seasons the Browns have had since returning to the NFL in 1999. This was the Browns’ last winning season until 2020.

Off-season

Coaching staff changes 
The Cleveland Browns’ offense was marred by bad play-calling throughout the early stages of the 2006 season, forcing the resignation of the team's offensive coordinator, Maurice Carthon, on October 24, 2006. Following Carthon's resignation, head coach Romeo Crennel hired assistant head coach and offensive line coach Jeff Davidson as the team's offensive coordinator for the remainder of the 2006 season. However, the Browns lost Davidson to the Carolina Panthers, where he was hired to serve as the Panthers’ offensive coordinator. Because of Davidson's hiring in Carolina, the Browns hired Rob Chudzinski as the team's new offensive coordinator. The team has also hired Ted Daisher as the team's new special teams coordinator.

Other coaching staff changes made by the Browns in the 2007 off-season include the hiring of Steve Marshall as the offensive line coach; Tom Myslinski as the strength-and-conditioning coach; Alan DeGennaro as the assistant strength-and-conditioning coach; Dave Atkins as the senior offensive assistant coach; Anthony Lynn as the running backs coach; Rip Scherer as the assistant head coach and quarterbacks coach; and Alfredo Roberts as the tight ends coach.

On June 14, defensive coordinator Todd Grantham's contract was extended by two years, allowing him to remain with the Browns through the 2009 season.

Roster changes 
The Cleveland Browns had one of the busiest off-seasons in terms of movement in the NFL. Beginning on March 3, 2007, the Browns signed former Cincinnati Bengals offensive guard Eric Steinbach to a seven-year contract and former Houston Texans outside linebacker Antwan Peek to a three-year contract; the team also resigned center Hank Fraley to a four-year contract, fearing that center LeCharles Bentley's 2006 season-ending knee injury may also be a career-ending injury.

The following day, March 4, the Browns signed former Washington Redskins cornerback Kenny Wright to a three-year contract. One day later, on March 5, the Browns lost wide receiver and punt returner Dennis Northcutt to the Jacksonville Jaguars under the terms of a five-year contract.

On March 8, the team signed former Baltimore Ravens running back Jamal Lewis to a one-year contract, bolstering the team's lackluster running game. Because of Lewis’ signing, running back Reuben Droughns had been made expendable, and was subsequently traded to the New York Giants for wide receiver Tim Carter on March 9.

Also on March 9, the Browns terminated the contract of veteran cornerback Daylon McCutcheon, citing that he failed a physical, and lost safety Brian Russell to the Seattle Seahawks, though the terms of Russell's deal were not disclosed.

Nearly a week later, on March 14, the Browns terminated the contract of fullback Terrelle Smith, prior to having to pay Smith a due roster bonus; the team also signed former Miami Dolphins offensive guard Seth McKinney to a one-year contract and former Tennessee Titans defensive end Robaire Smith to a four-year contract. On March 16, the Browns signed former Bengals defensive tackle Shaun Smith to a four-year contract. Four days later, on March 20, the team re-signed offensive guard Lennie Friedman to a one-year contract; the team also lost defensive end Alvin McKinley to the Denver Broncos.

On March 29, it was revealed that Browns general manager Phil Savage entered into talks with Kansas City Chiefs general manager Carl Peterson regarding their veteran quarterback, Trent Green. However, Green was instead traded to the Miami Dolphins.

On April 2, the team signed former San Francisco 49ers safety Mike Adams to a two-year contract. On April 14, the Browns re-signed veteran tight end Steve Heiden to a four-year contract extension, though terms of his deal were not disclosed. On April 16, the Browns signed former Ravens fullback Alan Ricard to a one-year contract, though terms of his deal were not disclosed; the team also formally announced the signing of former San Diego Chargers tight end Ryan Krause, though the date he was signed and the terms of his deal were not disclosed. On April 19, the Browns re-signed defensive tackle Ethan Kelley to the terms of a one-year contract.

On April 25, the Browns resigned free agents Simon Fraser and Mason Unck each to one-year contracts. On April 27, the Browns resigned free agent offensive lineman Nat Dorsey to a one-year contract. On May 2, the team waived offensive lineman Joe Andruzzi. Following his release, Andruzzi was hospitalized with lymphoma. The Browns release a statement wishing Andruzzi well, though it is not known whether his ailment is the reason the Browns released Andruzzi.

On May 3, the Browns announced the signings of nine undrafted free agents. Those players are: Jesse Ainsworth, a placekicker from Arizona State; Charles Ali, a fullback from Arkansas (Pine Bluff); Mike Alston, a linebacker from Toledo; Rick Drushal, an offensive lineman from Wooster; Hunter Funtaine, a linebacker from Vanderbilt; Mike Mason, a wide receiver from Tennessee State; Tyrone Moss, a halfback from Miami (Florida); Brent Pousson, an offensive lineman from McNeese State; and Scott Stephenson, an offensive lineman from Iowa State. The team also signed three try-out rookies on May 8, signing linebacker Kevin Sears, offensive lineman Cliff Louis and running back Jerome Jackson.

On June 17, the Browns waived cornerback Antonio Perkins, fullback Alan Ricard, and offensive linemen Brent Pousson and Scott Stephenson. On June 26, the team waived safety Ben Emanuel and claimed former Tampa Bay Buccaneer wide receiver Efrem Hill from waivers.

2007 NFL Draft 
Prior to the 2007 NFL Draft, the Browns were set to utilize either the third pick or fourth pick of the first round. This discrepancy was because the Browns and the Tampa Bay Buccaneers had similar records and strength-of-schedule averages. After the coin toss, it was determined that the Browns will use the third pick of the draft. The 2007 NFL Draft was held on April 28 and 29, 2007 in New York City.

The Browns selected Wisconsin offensive tackle Joe Thomas with the third overall pick of the draft.  However, the Browns selected Quinn with the 22nd selection of the draft, following a trade with the Dallas Cowboys, which saw the Browns send their second-round pick of the 2007 draft and their first-round pick of the 2008 NFL Draft to the Cowboys for their first-round pick at number 22. During the second round of the draft, the Browns made another trade with the Cowboys, this time using the selection to pick UNLV cornerback Eric Wright. The Browns gave up their third- and fourth-round picks of the draft, and swapped their sixth-round pick with the Cowboys.

On the second day of the draft, the Browns looked to fill holes left by departing players through free agency. In the fifth round, the Browns drafted Memphis cornerback Brandon McDonald; in the sixth round, the Browns drafted Hawaii defensive end Melila Purcell; and in the seventh round, the Browns drafted LSU defensive end Chase Pittman and Arizona wide receiver Syndric Steptoe.

On July 18, the Browns signed the first of their seven draft picks, signing Pittman to a four-year contract. On July 22, the Browns signed three more draft picks, this time signing McDonald, Purcell and Steptoe each to four-year contracts. Steptoe is likely to compete to be the team's starting punt-returner heading into the 2007 season. On July 26, the Browns signed Thomas to a six-year contract (voidable after five years) and Wright to a four-year contract. Thomas and Wright will look to battle to become the starters at left tackle and cornerback respectively.

Until August 7, the Browns and Brady Quinn could not agree on a contract, and the quarterback missed nearly two weeks of training camp. The parties then agreed, in principle, to a contract. Hours later, the team and Quinn finalized the contract, and Quinn signed with the team under the terms of a five-year contract. The contract is worth $20 million.

Coaching Staff

Final roster

Preseason

Schedule

Regular season

Schedule

Standings

Regular season week-by-week results

Week 1: vs. Pittsburgh Steelers 

Charlie Frye started the game, but was benched before halftime. In the week following the game, he was traded to the Seattle Seahawks for a sixth-round draft pick, and Derek Anderson was named the starter for the rest of the season.

Week 2: vs. Cincinnati Bengals

Week 3: at Oakland Raiders

Week 4: vs. Baltimore Ravens

Week 5: at New England Patriots

Week 6: vs. Miami Dolphins

Week 8: at St. Louis Rams

Week 9: vs. Seattle Seahawks

Week 10: at Pittsburgh Steelers

Week 11: at Baltimore Ravens

Week 12: vs. Houston Texans 

This was Terry McAulay's first game he officiated in Cleveland since the Bottlegate incident against Jacksonville on December 16, 2001.

Week 13: at Arizona Cardinals

Week 14: at New York Jets

Week 15: vs. Buffalo Bills 

With the win, the Browns improved to 9–5, securing the team's first winning season since 2002 and second overall since being reactivated in 1999. The win also kept the team's playoff chances alive as the Steelers lost to the Jaguars, creating a tie for 1st place in the AFC North.

Week 16: at Cincinnati Bengals 

Cleveland traveled to divisional rival Cincinnati, needing a win to secure the team's first playoff berth since 2002. After a scoreless first quarter, the Bengals scored 19 points in the second, 13 of which were on short drives due to two interceptions by Derek Anderson. The Browns' defense held the Bengals scoreless in the second half, while Anderson threw 2 touchdown passes. Cincinnati's last drive of the game ended in a fumble at the Cleveland 22-yard line, giving the Browns a chance to win the game with just under 2 minutes left. Cleveland would make it to Cincinnati's 29-yard line, but the game ended with an incomplete pass from Anderson. 

The loss dropped the Browns to 9–6 and meant the team no longer controlled its own destiny in securing a playoff berth. The Steelers' win over the Rams and the Browns' loss meant that Pittsburgh secured the AFC North. Additionally, Tennessee's win over the New York Jets would give the Titans the AFC's last wild card spot with a win in week 17 as they held tiebreakers over the Browns.

Week 17: vs. San Francisco 49ers 

With the win, the Browns finished the season at 10–6 for the team's first ten win season since being reactivated in 1999 and first since 1994. However, the Browns would be eliminated from postseason contention later in the day when the Tennessee Titans defeated the Indianapolis Colts to secure the AFC's last wild card spot. The Titans, who also finished 10–6, won the tiebreaker over the Browns due to having a better record against common opponents. This would be Cleveland's last winning season until 2020.

2008 Pro Bowl 
Six Browns players, wide receiver Braylon Edwards, kick returner Josh Cribbs, left tackle Joe Thomas, longsnapper Ryan Pontbriand, tight end Kellen Winslow II, and quarterback Derek Anderson were named to the AFC team to represent the Cleveland Browns during the 2008 Pro Bowl. Announced on December 18, 2007, this marked the first time since the 2001 NFL season when Jamir Miller played in the 2002 Pro Bowl as a linebacker that the Browns had any player named to the Pro Bowl. It was the most selections for a Browns team since the 1995 season.

Edwards was one of the AFC's reserve wide receivers, while Cribbs started as the AFC's kick returner. Thomas, Anderson, and Winslow were all voted first alternates but all played due to injuries or other players electing not to participate in the game. Pontbriand was elected as a "needs" player by the AFC coaching staff.

Guard Eric Steinbach (1st), fullback Lawrence Vickers (2nd), and placekicker Phil Dawson (3rd) were named alternates at their respective positions.

References

External links 
 2007 Cleveland Browns at Pro Football Reference (Profootballreference.com)
 2007 Cleveland Browns Statistics at jt-sw.com
 2007 Cleveland Browns Schedule at jt-sw.com
 2007 Cleveland Browns at DatabaseFootball.com  

Cleveland
Cleveland Browns seasons
Cleveland